Verónica Orozco Aristizábal (born June 8, 1979) is a Colombian actress and singer.

Private life
Orozco is the daughter of actor Luís Fernando Orozco and Carmenza Aristizábal Hoyos. She has two sisters, actress Ana María and Juliana.

In January 2007, she married Colombian comedian Martín de Francisco in Villa de Leyva but the couple separated in April 2010 and divorced later the same year. The following year Orozco met psychologist Juan Sebastian Restrepo, and their daughter Violeta was born in 2012.

Musical career
Orozco was a part of the Colombian TV musical show Okidoki, which led her to release three albums under the group name Okidoki in the early 1990s. In 2006 Orozco started her solo career, releasing the successful album Verónica Orozco. Her first single was "Las bragas", which had a lot of controversy around the lyrics suggesting lesbianism. Her second single was "Miénteme". It won an award for "Video del Año" (Video of the Year) at Los Premios Shock (Shock Awards). Her third single was "Descarada". She performed the song at Los Premios TV y Novelas and at one of the Nuestra Tierra 2007 concerts.

She also participated in the 2006 La Mega: Nuestra Tierra concerts, which showcased Colombian performers.

She later stated she would return to her music career and her second studio album was expected in mid-2009, but as of 2017 the only further release has been a one-off single "¿Dónde Está Mi Varón?" in 2016.

Movies

Television series

Solo discography

Albums
Verónica Orozco (2006)

Singles
"Las Bragas" (2006)
"Miénteme" (2007)
"Descarada" (2007)
"¿Dónde Está Mi Varón?" (2016)
"Mala" (2020)

Notes:
Her song "Pasion Asesina" was included in the Colombian movie Soñar no Cuesta Nada (A Ton of Luck), in which she was featured, playing the role of the stripper Dayana.
Her song "Las Bragas" was featured on the soundtrack for the Mexican TV show S.O.S.: Sexo y otros Secretos.

References

1979 births
Actresses from Bogotá
21st-century Colombian women singers
Colombian film actresses
Colombian telenovela actresses
Colombian television actresses
Living people
Singers from Bogotá
20th-century Colombian women singers